La chúcara (English: Rebel in Love) is a 2014 Chilean telenovela produced and broadcast by TVN.

Antonia Santa María and Felipe Braun will star as the protagonists, while Bárbara Ruiz-Tagle, Josefina Velasco, Íñigo Urrutia, Carolina Paulsen, Luna Martínez and Alejandra Vega will stars as the antagonists.

History 
 Rebel Love , tells the story of Laura Muñoz, a young woman who after years without coming to "Saint Piedad Farm", comes back-to-meet her mother and brother. She meets a stern-looking man, the recently widowed Vicente Correa.

Cast 
 Antonia Santa María as Laura Muñoz - Laura Montero
 Felipe Braun as Vicente Correa Gumucio
 Bárbara Ruiz-Tagle as Gracia Vial / Piedad Vial
 Eduardo Paxeco as Agustin Lara
 Mariana Derderian as Luciana Cavalli
 Íñigo Urrutia as Juan Cristobal Cañas
 Carmina Riego as Carmen Cubillos
 Josefina Velasco as Adriana del Solar Peñablanca
 Carolina Paulsen as Rebeca López
 Juan Pablo Miranda as Orlando "Negro" Opazo
 Alejandra Vega as Magdalena Andrade
 Pablo Casals as León Muñoz
 Nicole Espinoza as Carolina "Carito" Jiménez
 Luna Martínez as Roberta Correa
 Matías Torres as Francisco "Panchito" Correa

References

2014 telenovelas
2014 Chilean television series debuts
2015 Chilean television series endings
Chilean telenovelas
Spanish-language telenovelas
Televisión Nacional de Chile telenovelas